Part of series of articles upon Archaeology of Kosovo

Late Antiquity in Kosovo brings different currents of change that reverberate and affect it as well as the whole extent of the Roman Empire. It starts at the time of Constantine the Great, who was born in ancient Dardania with the acceptance and spread of Christianity, and continues as a tumultuous period because of the different barbaric invasions that plague the empire at that time, be that by Goths, Avars, Slavs, etc. Kosovo was always in an interesting strategic position, being situated between the old-world East and West, at that time the eastern and western Roman empire.

With the decline of the western Roman Empire, we see an intriguing development where some of the emperors of Rome are Illyrians or Dardanians. To list a few prominent ones: Justinian, Constantine, and Diocletian. They bring a breath of fresh air to the antiquated system of government of Rome and replace the capital to Constantinople, which brings forth a new surge of civilization and knowledge. While the Dark Age is in full swing in Europe, Kosovo and Balkans in general see a migration of new people in its territories, and even though not in peace, see a period of progression. The old knowledge of the Classics is not lost nor forgotten, and a new development in art and architecture starts. This puts Kosovo in an interesting position being that it becomes a bridge through which we see these different influences of civilization happen, whereas we see an influence of Romanesque, Byzantine, and later Ottoman styles of life, philosophy, religion and architecture. We also see during this tumultuous period the building of many fortifications to protect the population from the uncertainties of conquest from abroad.  Below we will see some of the settlements and fortresses in Kosovo. Being that this is an archaeological article, we excluded the sacral monuments, but it would be interesting to study them as well, considering their age and continuous use, since the very first days of Christianity until today, through different creeds and nationalities. As an example we will take the Gračanica monastery which is built on top of an ancient Christian basilica, a continuation of the ancient town of Municipium Ulpiana.

Settlements

Vrela

The village of Vrela is situated approximately 7 km west from the town of Istok. Archaeological excavations conducted here in 2010, unearthed remains and foundations of a church with small dimensions, typical for the early Christian period (4th–6th century AD). Close to the church, a necropolis is set that is most probably linked to the settlement
sited in the upper part of the hill. Excavations carried in the church, revealed a large type of crypt grave, measuring: 2.80m in length, 1.40m in width and 1.40m in height, constructed in the shape of a semicircular arch or vault. The grave is oriented east–west and at the western side a small entry gate of 0.6m, in height, with an archway has been recorded. Nonetheless, the crypt/grave was constructed with tough stones, and what is interesting, inside the unearthed grave, intact mortal remains of a male was discovered, buried according to the Christian rites.

Mališevska Banja

The village of Mališevska Banja, situated southeast from the town of Mališevo, on the left side of the Mirusha river shore, an archaeological site known by the toponymy 'Trojet e Vjetra' is found. This archaeological site has a character of a burial mound (tumulus) and was erected during the Iron Age, but reused during the Early Medieval period. Investigations, respectively archaeological excavations were carried out at this location in 2005, which resulted with confirmation of graves identification, constructed with stone slabs and very rich with grave goods. Among the most important findings, Early Medieval jewelry made of bronze like rings, bracelets, and necklaces with a symbol of Christian crosses were recorded and documented.

Harilaq Fortress

The Ariljača fortress/castle (4th–6th century AD), is situated on top
of the hill known by the local toponymy as the Gradina – Ariljača, set in an
erased and dominant position, west from the Ariljača village. The fortress
is located in an altitude of maximum 766 meters above the sea level, and
is approximately sited 9 km southeast from the town of Kosovo Polje and
only 2 kilometers west from Pristina International Airport "Adem Jashari".
The total surface of the fortress, also counting along the circular walls/ ramparts,
measures around 1.3 hectares of the inner space of the stronghold.
The archaeological excavations at this site were conducted in several seasons,
commencing in 2005 and were carried out systematically until 2009.
Nonetheless, several conservations and consolidations of the circuit walls
were done in order to preserve the remains. During the archaeological five
season's works, numerous remains and foundations of sacral, profane and
utilitarian buildings were discovered. In regard, the entire outer sides of
the rampart with towers at the axes were unearthed, as well as a church
with three naves and a Saskrity are discovered, but also two almost identical
structures in a rounded shape of an unknown sacral complex has been
uncovered, as well. On the other hand, vast movable archaeological material
composed of; metal made working tools, jewelry, coins, bricks, glass
fragments and architectural structures, all clear indications that pinpoint to
the Late Antique date and especially typical for the Justinian Period. Also,
at this fortress traces of prehistoric periods have been evidenced, especially
emphasizing the metal periods, but it continued to exist all through antiquity
and up to the Medieval Period.

Podgrađe Fortress

The fortress of Podgrađe is situated at the area of the Podgrađe village, positioned on a low hill of 567
meters above sea level. The fortress is located around 10 kilometers southwest of Gnjilane and below the Podgrađe hill flows the river
of Binačka Morava. The plan of the citadel of the Podgrađe fortress has a shape of irregular pentagonal, while, the southern wall of the central tower served as a fortifying wall for the citadel. On the highest part, remains of a watchtower are still visible, whose walls are partially preserved up to ten meters height. In regard, the tower watch is constructed in rectangularform measuring eight by eight meters. Likewise, at the corners of the ramparts, smaller dimension towers are set. In the western, northern and northeastern angles of the fortification walls, the small towers go up to four meters height. The inner space of the fortification has a total area of approximately 1.2 hectares and it is typical construction for the period of the Emperor Justinian the Great (6th century AD), respectively, the Podgrađe fortress takes part in the frame of the net fortifications erected in Dardania during the end of the Late Antiquity.

Korisha Fortress with The Early Christian Church

The archaeological excavations
conducted in two seasons; 2002 and 2004
at the Korisha fortress located at the area
known by the toponymy as the 'Gralishta'
hill, revealed contours and documented
the plan of an early
Christian church of the
6th century AD. The
Korisha early Christian
church which is located
inside the fortress has an
apse oriented toward the
east. Inside the church,
traces of a cintron are
constructed in the form
of stairs and in the shape
of trapeze. Within the
altar area of the church
parts of the banisters
were documented. The
movable archaeological
material, abundant and
diverse findings were recorded here, which,
besides the Late Antique date, the fragments
of pottery of the Middle Bronze Age
were evidenced also, which most probably
are related with the Bronze Age site situated
only few hundred meters northeast from
the fortress. Nonetheless, many amphora's,
pithos, jars, jugs, etc. were discovered, of
the Late Antique date, which confirms occupancy
of the fortress and the church during
the 4th–6th century AD.

Kasterc Fortress
The archaeological site, respectively the fortification of the Kasterc,
positioned more or less 12 kilometers northwest from the town of
Suva Reka (Theranda), witnessed to be a multilayer archaeological center
that continued to exist from the prehistoric times, more precisely, from
a Copper Age as a fortified settlement and then reused and rebuilt into
a stronghold during the reign of the emperor Justinian. The site was
reused as a necropolis during the medieval period. The fortress area was
under three archaeological researches; in 1986, trial trenches were carried
out here, reflecting a general overview of this site. Archaeological
investigations continued in 2010 and again in 2011, discovering an area
of just about 500 square meters, these excavations brought to light an
early Christian church and other exclusive movable archaeological material
composed of; iron working tools, earthen ware, jewelry, earrings,
bracelets, coins, etc.

Vučak Fortress

At the village of Vučak, which is located at the verge of the Kasmaç
Mountain, situated around 12 km southwest from the town of Glogovac,
placed in a very dominant position, traces of ruins that follow the
terrain configuration of the hill are observable. In fact, there are two
forts, one known as the Gjyteti i Madh and Gjyteti i Vogël (big fort and
small fort). The collected and recorded archaeological material, confirm
human activity since prehistoric up to the Medieval period. Nonetheless,
this Fortress was typical for the period of the Late Antiquity as it
served as a defense system for the local population.

Stroc Fortress
The village of Stroc is known for the existence of a fortress set
at the Gradina hill, a fortress which was used in continuity since prehistory,
Late Antiquity and Early Medieval period. Traces of the walls set
in the shape of the cascades which incline up to the top of the hill, are
noticeable at the Gradina hillside. Even in the present days, traces of
the forts towers and ramparts are visible, measuring up to two meters
wide walls. Based on the terrain configuration and evidenced remains,
presumable at this location, in the past, a cult object used to exist and
served to the local population.

Llapushnik Fortress
The Llapushnik fortress is situated at the mountainous area of
Drenica region, set close to the Llapushnik outfall, located about 10 km
southwest from the town of Drenas. The Llapushnik fortress was characterized
with a stronghold fortification measuring 200 with 300 meters.
The circuit defense walls were up to 2 meters wide and guarded by
side towers. The "fortress tower" measured 10 x 10 meters, and around
the site, Late Antique tiles are scattered all over the place.

Llanishta Fortress
Around 1 km south from Kačanik, at the decreased area up to
maximum 684 meters above the sea level, at the site known as the 'Vranjak'
remains of a fortress have been recorded, whereas, a wall of up to
1.7 m wide and 2.5-3m height was recorded. The wall was constructed
by the use of local stones bonded with lime mortar and positioned above
the natural rocks. Whereas, up in the hill, the wall of the fortress is preserved
in line of 50–60 m length, that follows the contours of the hill.
The fortress communicates through a slope with the Llanishta village.

Suka e Cërmjanit Fortification
On top of a hill around 500 meters
above the sea level, in the northern
part of the Cërmjan village, in one geostrategic
position, the Suka e Cërmjanit is
positioned, an archeological site known
also as the Castel of Cërmjan.
The fortification walls follow the
contour line of the rocky terrain configuration
in a surface of around 1.3 hectares.
The Suka e Cërmjanit castle has all the
features of a fortified settlement of the
Late Antique date, although based on the
earlier archaeological documentation,
remains of a prehistoric date, respectively
the occupation commencing from Iron
Period continued uninterrupted until the
Early Medieval Period.
The castle has a distinctive site
setting while can visually communicate
with; Dollc and Jerina castles of Klina
up north, with Radavc and Jablanica of
Peć castles up northwest, Đakovica is visible
in the horizon towards southwest,
fortress of Zatrič is visible
toward north-northeast and toward the
south the countryside of hills and fields
are visible up to the verge of the Pashtrik
Mountains.

Zatrič

Remains of the fortified settlement
of Iron Age and Late Antique/Early
Medieval 'Gradishta' of Zatrič, is sited on
top of the Zatrič hill, with the highest altitude
of 1039 meters above the sea level.
This 'fortified town' of a multilayer settlement
type, was erected in a perimeter
line which follows the terrain contour;
location chosen which is naturally protected
and integrated with the man made
constructed protection system.
Traces of the fragmented pottery
have been found in the entire fortified
area, as well at the "Arat e Gradishtës"
(Gradishta fields) found at the terraced
plateaus nearby the fortress. Earthen
ware fragmented dishes, of different
dates have been found here, like: Iron
Age, Hellenistic Period, Late Antique,
and Medieval. Nonetheless, this archaeological
center, respectively, characteristic
fortification site, is unique, where an
Italian specialist for the ancient rock art
studies, has identified symbols and signs
that were evaluated to be a creation of the
humans before at least 7 millenniums.

Veletin Fortress
Veletin fortress is situated around five kilometers southeast
from the archaeological site of Ulpiana and approximately, 1.5 kilometers
northwest from Janjeva, set on a hilly part of the Shashkoc village
which is an 'island' of Municipality of Prishtina. The fortress is located
on top of the Veletin hill, reaching the highest elevation of 970 meters
above the sea level. Great geostrategic position of the stronghold, clear
surveillance on the western part that visually communicates with Ulpiana,
which is set on a low land, makes this fort a very important site for
the entire surrounding archaeological area.
Archaeological excavations carried
out here during the eighties, resulted
with the fact that the fortress was constructed
and reconstructed and was in
use since the earlier times, while the ore
exploitation and ancient mining was a major
economical income commencing from
prehistoric periods, continuously through
Roman, Late Antique and Medieval Periods.

Donji Grabovac
The rural settlement
of the Grabocit i Ulët, is positioned
nearby the Drenica river, around
9 km west from the town of Kosovo Polje.
At the Berisha neighborhood, at the site
known by the locals as "Bahçe" initially in
2004 and then later in several excavation
campaigns, graves within an Early Medieval
necropolis were unearthed. Over a
dozen graves, in majority in a good and
well preserved condition and intact human
remains have been excavated and recorded
here, except two skeletons which were beheaded.
The grave orientations were westeast
(respectively the head toward west
and the feat toward east). A considerable
amount of the fragmented pottery of either
glazed medieval but also few prehistoric
date fragments of ceramics have been collected
here. However, what draws the attention
at this site is that the Arbër culture witnessed
which is mainly composed of; jewelry, weaponry,
working tools, pottery and rare glass
jars which were part of the grave goods collected
in this place.
Rewardingly, the grave goods within
the burials were very rich especially with the
jewelry discovered here. Among the most
distinguished findings where; bronze rings,
bracelets (one of them is twist decorated) a
coin with a hole that might indicate that was
used together with a necklace and a pair of
bronze granulated earrings.

Matičane
The filigran artisan work in gold, silver and gems with Byzantine
imitations of the jewelry certainly present the work of a skilled local
goldsmith, but also illustrates creative artistic talent and on the other
hand, reflects on the welfare and high economical and social status of
the late (deceased) persons buried at the Matičane necropolis. Besides
the grave gods which are a rich archaeological material, respectively
precious artifacts, an important documentation in archaeological record,
are the physical remains (human remains, skeletons) that from
the anthropological aspect offer important information on the buried
persons at this necropolis.
Earlier village of Matičane, today neighborhood of Pristina, is
known in the archaeological literature on the occasion of the discovery
and recording of the necropolis known as the Matiçani i Poshtëm old
cemetery, this later on confirmed based on the material culture and
archaeological chronology, this site is dated in the time frame from 10th
to 11th century AD. Furthermore, the distinguished necropolis, witnessed
mortal remains graves/burials of the local autochthonous Christian
population. Rich and abundant grave goods, respectively versatile
archaeological material recorded here are composed mainly of woman
jewelry of the highest quality and good material, it identifies the flourishing
past of this region.

Novo Brdo

On a smaller mountain set between Prilepnica and Kriva Reka,
around 30–35 km west from Gnjilane and approximately, 39 kilometers
south-east from Pristina, the ruins of the medieval town and fortress
of Novo Brdo are to be seen. Based on the written sources discovered
so far, Novo Brdo was mentioned for the first time at the first decades
of the 14th century AD, with the name Nuovo Monte (New Mountain).
The Medieval town was a mining center and up to the present days, remains
of the walls, watch towers and foundations of several other sacral
monuments within the area of the fortress are still preserved. The Novo Brdo
fortress is composed by; the Upper Town and the Lower Town,
built on the Novo Brdo hill. The Novo Brdo Upper Town, was erected
on top of the hill, while below, toward west, the Lower Town stretches
in a wide countryside territory.
The fortress has access only
from the eastern part, whereas
from the other parts the hills
are steep and inclining toward
the walleye. Toward the eastern
part, the terrain gradually
raises what makes possible to
pass to a lower hill in a plateau
whereas ruins of a large medieval
church of cathedral type
are to be found.

Kaljaja

The historic town of Prizren,
unique in position, dwelling structures
and vernacular architecture,
among tens of other monuments of
culture recorded here, is known for
a unique fortress known as Kaljaja or Prizren Fortress,
which during its existence for many centuries from the ancientness up
to nowadays, carries multiple and evident traces of colourful cultural
heritage. Kaljaja of Prizren due to the extraordinary good geostrategic
position, structural integrity and the wide observation horizon, with all
these factors emphases the monumental values of this cultural entity.
The fortress of the Kaljaja is situated on a dominant hill
at the eastern part of the town of Prizren, set on a strategic position,
contoured with lines that follow distinguished features of the terrain
natural morphology. Archaeological excavations were carried out here
in 1969 and then again in 2004, 2009–2011;
which resulted with the discovery of the
infrastructure, which incorporates rampart
walls enforced with towers, casemates,
labyrinth corridors, depots, and other accompanying inner rooms and
dwellings. In the aspect of construction,
the fortress is divided
in three different complexes
which are known as the; Upper
Town, Lower Town and
Southern Town. While on the
fortification aspect phases, the
fortress was used in different periods
like; Antiquity, Byzantine Period,
Medieval Period and Ottoman Period rule.
The Prizren Kalaja is one of the
most valuable monuments of
the Kosovo cultural and historical
heritage and is also known as
the 'Open Museum'.

Notes 

Notes:

See also
Illyrians
Dardanians (Balkans)
Roman cities in Illyria
Archaeology of Kosovo
Roman Period Sites in Kosovo
Neolithic Sites in Kosovo
Copper, Bronze and Iron Age Sites in Kosovo

References

Bibliography
Nicholas Marquez Grant, Linda Fibiger. "Kosovo" The Routledge Handbook of Archaeological Human Remains and Legislation, Taylor & Francis, 2011, 
Milot Berisha. "Archaeological Guide of Kosovo", Kosovo Ministry of Culture, Youth and Sports and Archaeological Institute of Kosovo, Prishtine 2012, Print
Luan Përzhita, Kemajl Luci, Gëzim Hoxha, Adem Bunguri, Fatmir Peja, Tomor Kastrati. "Harta Arkeologjike e Kosovës vëllimi 1/ Archaeological Map of Kosovo vol.1" Akademia e Shkencave dhe e Arteve e Kosovës, Prishtinë 2006, 
Cultural Heritage Without Borders. "An Archaeological Map of the Historic Zone of Prizren", CHwB Kosovo office, Report Series No.2/2006.
Gail Warrander, Verena Knaus. "Kosovo 2nd ed." Bradt Travel Guides, 2011, 
Besiana Xharra, Source: Balkan Insight, "Kosovo's Lost City Rises From Earthy Tomb", http://archaeologynewsnetwork.blogspot.com/2011/01/kosovos-lost-city-rises-from-earthy.html#.UR95dvI7owo
Tom Derrick, "Ulpiana: Digging in Kosovo" source: https://web.archive.org/web/20130308102614/http://www.trinitysaintdavid.ac.uk/en/schoolofclassics/news/name,14937,en.html
Philip L. Kohl, Clare Fawcett, "Nationalism, Politics and the Practice of Archaeology", Cambridge University Press, 1995, 

Archaeological sites in Kosovo
 
Illyrian Kosovo